Diego Xaraba (1652–1715) was a Spanish organist and composer.  A nephew of organist Pablo Bruna, Xaraba studied with him at Daroca.  He is known to have been working as the organist of El Pilar in Zaragoza in around 1676; he was later employed in the chapel of Carlos II in Madrid, where he died.  A few of his organ works have been recorded.

References
David Mason Greene, Biographical Dictionary of Composers.

External links

1652 births
1715 deaths
Spanish male classical composers
Spanish classical organists
Male classical organists
Spanish Baroque composers
18th-century keyboardists
18th-century classical composers
18th-century male musicians